Montezumina modesta, known generally as modest katydid, is a species of phaneropterine katydid in the family Tettigoniidae. Other common names include the modest bush cricket and Montezuma katydid. It is found in North America.

References

Phaneropterinae
Articles created by Qbugbot
Insects described in 1878